Sharon Lynn Johnson Coleman (born July 19, 1960) is a United States district judge of the United States District Court for the Northern District of Illinois. She was formerly a justice of the Illinois Appellate Court, First District, 3rd Division.

Early life and education 
Coleman was born in Chicago, Illinois and graduated from Northern Illinois University in 1981 with a Bachelor of Arts in History. She went on to receive her Juris Doctor degree in 1984 from Washington University School of Law.

Legal career 
After law school, Coleman was an Assistant State’s Attorney in Cook County from 1984 until 1989. From 1989 to 1993, Coleman served as an Assistant United States Attorney in the Northern District of Illinois. Between 1993 and 1996, she held the position of Deputy State’s Attorney and Bureau Chief for the Public Interest Bureau of the Cook County State’s Attorney’s Office. From 1996 until 2008, Coleman served as a judge of the Circuit Court of Cook County, Illinois where she worked in the child protection division and the law division. She sat on the Illinois Appellate Court in Chicago, a position she held from 2008 to 2010.

Federal judicial service 
On February 24, 2010, President Barack Obama nominated Coleman to fill the seat on the United States District Court for the Northern District of Illinois that had been vacated by Mark Filip, who resigned in 2008 to become United States Deputy Attorney General. She was one of several recommendations for the seat from Senator Dick Durbin. The United States Senate confirmed Coleman by an 86–0 vote on July 12, 2010. She received her commission on July 13, 2010.

Notable case

Judge Coleman has presided over a number of high-profile cases. Among those are a ruling that enabled same sex couples to marry in February 2014 in advance of the June 2014 effective date for same sex marriages in Illinois. In 2015, Judge Coleman sentenced former Illinois Representative Derrick Smith to five months in prison for a bribery conviction related to pocketing a bribe from a purported day care. Smith also was ordered to serve a year of supervised release and complete 360 hours of community service. During a patent infringement case revolving around electronic trading software patents, Judge Coleman granted default judgment to Chicago-based Trading Technologies International Inc. after Rosenthal Collins and Trading Technologies counter-sued each other and litigated for nearly six years. Judge Coleman also ordered sanctions against Rosenthal Collins after finding that a company witness had wiped computer disks that allegedly contained evidence relevant to the case and misrepresented his actions to the court.

Personal 
Coleman and her husband, Wheeler Coleman, live in Chicago.

See also 
 List of African-American federal judges
 List of African-American jurists

References

External links 

1960 births
Living people
African-American judges
Illinois state court judges
Judges of the United States District Court for the Northern District of Illinois
Northern Illinois University alumni
United States district court judges appointed by Barack Obama
21st-century American judges
Washington University School of Law alumni
Assistant United States Attorneys
21st-century American women judges